Kunal Sawant (born 23 August 1986) is an Indian football goalkeeper playing in the I-League for Kenkre FC.

Early life
Kunal Sawant was born in Mumbai and completed his schooling at Don Bosco High School, Borivali. He was well-known for his love of sports. Ever since his school days, Sawant was popular for maverick traits in the field of sports; he was a keeper (goalkeeper / wicketkeeper) for the school's cricket, football, and hockey teams.

Amateur league
Soon after schooling, Sawant was selected for Goans Sports Club (a local club in Mumbai, playing in the First Division) and played with them from 2002 until 2003. He was later selected to play with Mahindra United U-19 team and had a brief stint of exposure to play at the Indian National Football League.
From 2004 until 2009, Sawant played for New India Assurance (Super division), Dena Bank (Super division), Union Bank of India (Elite division) and Central Railway (Elite Division).

Professional league

In 2009, Bimal Ghosh initiated Sawant into India's professional football circle, to play for Air India’s football team. Two years later, on Thursday, 3 February 2011, Sawant found himself at the cusp of an end to his career owing to an on-field injury during a match against Salgaocar F.C. while playing in an I-League match. Medical professionals advised Sawant that his hand would recover gradually, but his career never would.

However, Sawant made a comeback on 28 October 2012 with Mumbai F.C. in the I-League. Sawant also represented Maharashtra in Santosh Trophy tournament in 2009, 2010 and 2012. During 2015 I-League season hiatus, 4 Mumbai F.C. players - Climax Lawrence (Former India Captain), Nicholas Rodrigues, Valerian Rebello and Sawant, were invited to play for Tuff Laxmi Prasad Sports Club on a short-term contract in the Goa Professional League.

Indian Super League (ISL)

In June 2016, Sawant signed a contract with Sachin Tendulkar's Kerala Blasters FC to be the team's goalkeeper for the 2016 Indian Super League. Kerala Blasters FC finished the tournament by securing the second position.

Presently, Sawant is playing for Mumbai City FC.

References

1986 births
Living people
Indian footballers
Footballers from Mumbai
Mumbai FC players
Don Bosco schools alumni
Association football goalkeepers